Barton Dock Road is a tram stop built on the Trafford Park Line of Greater Manchester's Metrolink light rail system. The stop is located on Barton Dock Road by the remodelled Peel Circle roundabout, and was created to serve passengers boarding and alighting at EventCity and the Trafford Centre. It opened on 22 March 2020.

History
The original proposed included a "Lostock Parkway" stop, just south of the eventual location on the disused Trafford Park Railway freight line by Park Way (A5081). During the construction period the stop was known as EventCity, but was renamed before the line opened by Transport for Greater Manchester in 2020 as the venue known as EventCity had already announced plans to move elsewhere.

Services
From this stop a service runs generally every 12 minutes towards Cornbrook and towards the Trafford Centre.

References

Tram stops in Trafford
Railway stations in Great Britain opened in 2020